Desire is the fourth studio album by English synth-pop duo Hurts. It was released on 29 September 2017 by Columbia Records. The album's lead single "Beautiful Ones" was released on 21 April 2017. It was followed by the second single "Ready to Go", which was released on 1 September 2017, and "Chaperone", which was released on 12 October 2017 as the third single.

Background
On 26 May 2017, Hurts announced the release of a new album called Desire through their official Facebook page. They described it as an "album full of passion, pain and lust", stating that it has some of the best music they have ever made. Hurts' frontman Theo Hutchcraft told NME to expect a "big, personal, pop album". He said: "I guess this time we tried to just make a big pop record, and it's got echoes of all three records. There are all these avenues we've gone down in the past, take a little bit from there, little bit from here. But overall we just wanted to make a big, powerful pop record and that's definitely the track we're on." Lyrically, the album is meant to revolve around the duo's personal stories, as Hutchcraft mentioned: "We've just been a bit more personal on this record. We learn how to open up and we have different experiences."

On 23 September 2017, the duo started sharing small clips of each song before the full release of the album.

Commercial performance
Desire debuted at number 21 on the UK Albums Chart, selling 3,712 copies in its first week.

Track listing

Personnel
Credits adapted from Tidal.
 Theo Hutchcraft – songwriting, production, vocals
 Adam Anderson – songwriting, production
 Lael Goldberg – songwriting, production
 David Sneddon – songwriting
 Joe Kearns – engineer
 Adam Lunn – engineer
 Matty Green – mixing engineer
 'Hot City Horns' - Mike Davis, Paul Burton, Kenji Fenton - (all brass & woodwind)

Charts

References

2017 albums
Columbia Records albums
Hurts albums